F81 may refer to:

 a number of naval warships; including:
 SPS Santa María (F81)
 HMS Sutherland (F81)
 Substitution model